Antonino Trapani (born May 29, 1952, in Palermo) is a retired Italian professional football player who played as a goalkeeper.

References

External links
Profile at Carrierecalciatori.it

1952 births
Living people
Footballers from Palermo
Italian footballers
Palermo F.C. players
U.S. Catanzaro 1929 players
S.S.D. Varese Calcio players
S.S.D. Marsala Calcio players
Association football goalkeepers
Serie A players
Serie B players